The 2020 Central Arkansas Bears football team represented the University of Central Arkansas in the 2020–21 NCAA Division I FCS football season as a member of the Southland Conference. The Bears were led by third-year head coach Nathan Brown and played their home games at Estes Stadium.

Previous season
The Bears finished the 2019 season 9–3, 7–2 in Southland play, earning a share of the 2019 Southland Conference championship, and a first round bye in the FCS playoffs with a #8 seeding. They lost in the second round of the FCS Playoffs to Illinois State.

Preseason

Preseason poll
The Southland Conference released their original preseason poll in July 2020. The Bears were picked to finish first in the conference, prior to their schedule split from the rest of the league. In addition, thirteen Bears were chosen to the Preseason All-Southland Team

(*) These teams opted out of playing in the revised spring 2021 Southland schedule, and instead played as Independent in the fall of 2020.

Preseason All–Southland Teams

Offense

1st Team
Breylin Smith – Quarterback, JR
Lujuan Winningham – Wide Receiver, JR
Jalen Hendrix – Offensive Lineman, JR
Toby Sanderson – Offensive Lineman, SR

2nd Team
Jack Short – Tight End/Halfback, SR
Tyler Hudson – Wide Receiver, SO
Hayden Ray – Kicker, JR

Defense

1st Team
Nathan Grant – Defensive Lineman, SR
TJ Campbell – Linebacker, JR
Robert Rochell – Defensive Back, SR
Cameron Myers – Kick Returner, RS-SO

2nd Team
A'Javious Brown – Defensive Lineman, SR
J. W. Jones – Defensive Lineman, SR

Roster

Schedule
Central Arkansas had a game scheduled against Missouri, which was canceled due to the COVID-19 pandemic. Due to the Southland delaying conference play until Spring 2021, Central Arkansas is playing as an independent for the 2020 season. Since they are playing more than 3 games during the fall, Central Arkansas will not participate in conference play in the spring.  

Source:

Game summaries

vs. Austin Peay

Sources:
    
    
    
    
    
    
    
    

Uniform combination: white helmet, white jersey, white pants w/ purple accents

at UAB

Sources:
    
    
    
    
    
    
    
    
    
    
    
    

Uniform combination: white helmet, white jersey, white pants w/ purple accents

Missouri State

Sources:
    
    
    
    
    
    
    
    

Uniform combination: white helmet, purple jersey, purple pants w/ white and gray accents

at North Dakota State

Sources:
    
    
    
    
    
    
    
    
    
    
    

Uniform combination: white helmet, white jersey, white pants w/ purple accents

at Arkansas State

Sources:
    
    
    
    
    
    
    
    
    
    
    
    
    

Uniform combination: grey helmet, white jersey, white pants w/ purple accents

at Missouri State

Sources:
    

Uniform combination:

at Eastern Kentucky

Sources:
    

Uniform combination:

Missouri Western

Sources:
    

Uniform combination:

Eastern Kentucky

Sources:
    

Uniform combination:

at Louisiana

Sources:
    

Uniform combination:

Players drafted into the NFL

References

Central Arkansas
Central Arkansas Bears football seasons
Central Arkansas Bears football